This is a list of Primera División de Fútbol Profesional Coaches. Some of these managers were appointed as caretaker managers prior to being given a permanent position.

Current Primera Division coaches

List of Coaches (1998-present)
List of coaches in the Apertura and Clausura format
  Rubén Alonso - Alianza F.C. (1998), C.D. Municipal Limeño (2000), San Salvador F.C. (2002, 2003, 2004), A.D. Isidro Metapan (2005-2006), Independiente Nacional 1906 (2007), San Salvador F.C. (2008), UES (2010), C.D. Aguila (2010), Alianza F.C. (2015-2016), C.D. Chalatenango (2016), C.D. Sonsonate (2017-2018)
  Julio Escobar - Firpo (1998, 1999, 2000, 2001), Alianza F.C. (2002)
  Miloš Miljanić - C.D. Aguila (1998), Firpo (2001, 2002, 2003, 2006), San Salvador F.C. (2004), Alianza F.C. (2010-2011), Alianza F.C. (2013)
  Oscar Emigdio Benitez - C.D. FAS (1998-1999), C.D. Municipal Limeño (1999), Atletico Balboa (2001), C.D. Municipal Limeño (2002), Atletico Balboa (2004), Once Municipal (2004), Alianza F.C. (2006), San Salvador F.C. (2008), Firpo (2008)
  Luis Angel Leon +  - ADET (1999), C.D. Juventud Olímpica Metalio (2000), Atletico Marte (2002)
  Antonio Carlos Vieira - C.D. Aguila (1999), C.D. Dragon (2002), Municipal Limeno (2003)
   Reno Renucci - Alianza F.C. (1999)
  José Luis Rugamas - Arabe Marte (1999)
  Nelson Brizuela - Firpo (1999), C.D. Dragon (1999, 2000, 2002), Atlético Marte (2001), Atletico Balboa (2003), A.D. Isidro Metapan (2003), Municipal Limeno (2005), Alianza F.C. (2006, 2007)
  Juan Quarterone + - ADET (1999, 2000, 2001), Atletico Balboa (2002), Alianza F.C. (2003), C.D. Chalatenango (2003), Atletico Balboa (2004, 2005), San Salvador F.C. (2005, 2006), Independiente Nacional 1906 (2006, 2007)
  Hugo Coria - C.D. Aguila (1999, 2000, 2001, 2002, 2003, 2004, 2011, 2020), San Salvador F.C. (2005-2006), Once Municipal (2007, 2008), Firpo (2010)
  Juan Carlos Masnik +  - C.D. FAS (1999)
  Walter Cifuentes - C.D. Juventud Olímpica Metalio (1999)
  Genaro Sermeño + - C.D. Juventud Olímpica Metalio (1999)
  Rubén Guevara - C.D. FAS (1999, 2001), C.D. Aguila (2002), Municipal Limeno (2003), Once Lobos (2005)
  Manuel Oberti - Alianza F.C. (2000)
  Juan Ramón Paredes - Atlético Marte (2000, 2010-2011), C.D. FAS (2000), Alianza F.C. (2001, 2002, 2004, 2005, 2012), San Salvador F.C. (2005), Independiente Nacional 1906 (2006), Once Municipal (2008), C.D. Sonsonate (2018)
  Ricardo Mena Laguán - C.D. FAS (2000), C.D. Arcense (2003), C.D. FAS (2012)
  Manuel Mejía & Pedro Interiano - Santa Clara (2000)
  Saul Molina - Santa Clara (2000), San Luis (2001), Atletico Balboa (2001), C.D. Aguila (2005)
  Jaime Rodriguez - Alianza F.C. (2000), San Salvador F.C. (2002)
  Mauricio Pachín González - Atlético Marte (2000, 2001)
  Jose Mario Martínez - Atletico Balboa (2000, 2002, 2011), C.D. Dragon (2003, 2013), C.D. Vista Hermosa (2005, 2006, 2007), C.D. Vista Hermosa (2009-2010), Firpo (2016)
  Agustin Castillo - Municipal Limeno (2000-2001), FAS (2001-2005), C.D. Chalatenango (2005, 2006, 2007), C.D. Aguila (2008, 2021-2022), Firpo (2008, 2009), FAS (2011, 2012, 2015), C.D. Sonsonate (2016), Metapan (2018)
  Cesar Acevedo - C.D. FAS (2000)
  Roberto Abruzzesse - C.D. FAS (2000)
   Garabet Avedissian - C.D. FAS (2000, 2001), Atletico Balboa (2003), Sonsonate (2017-)
  Saul Lorenzo Rivero - C.D. Aguila (2001), A.D. Isidro Metapan (2004), San Salvador F.C. (2004), Firpo (2005), San Salvador F.C. (2007)
  Carlos Reyes  +   - Alianza F.C. (2001)
  Miguel Aguilar Obando - C.D. Dragon (2001), Firpo (2008), C.D. Aguila (2018)
  Hernán Carrasco Vivanco - Municipal Limeno (2001), Atletico Marte (2002)
  Jorge Martinez - Atlético Marte (2001)
  Kiril Dojcinovski  +   - Municipal Limeno (2001), Firpo (2002)
  Edwin Portillo - A.D. Isidro Metapan (2001, 2002, 2003, 2004, 2005, 2006, 2007-2013, 2017-2018, 2019), C.D. Aguila (2014), C.D. Sonsonate (2015-2016)
  Alfredo Encalada - C.D. Dragon (2001)
  Oscar "Lagarto" Ulloa  - A.D. Isidro Metapan (2001)
  José Calazán - A.D. Isidro Metapan (2001)
  Roberto Fabrizio - A.D. Isidro Metapan (2002)
  Abraham Vasquez - Firpo (2002)
  German Gutiérrez de Piñeres  - Alianza F.C. (2002)
  Ricardo Guardado - C.D. Arcense (2002, 2003)
  Henry Vanegas - Municipal Limeno (2002, 2003), Alianza F.C. (2003), Atletico Balboa (2005), San Salvador F.C. (2007), C.D. Vista Hermosa (2008), Dragon
  Ramón Maradiaga - C.D. Aguila (2003)
  Domingo Ramos - C.D. Dragon (2003)
  Gilberto Yearwood- C.D. Dragon (2003)
   Carlos Barone - Atletico Balboa (2003)
  Manuel Alberto Solano - Atletico Balboa (2003)
  Luis Roberto Hernández - C.D. Chalatenango (2003)
  Gustavo de Simone - Firpo (2003-2004), Atletico Balboa (2008), Nejapa F.C. (2009, 2010)
  Raul Cocherari - A.D. Isidro Metapan (2003), C.D. Chalatenango (2004), Municipal Limeno (2004)
  Jorge Alberto Garcia - Municipal Limeno (2003, 2004), Atletico Balboa (2004, 2005, 2009), C.D. Aguila (2005), Once Municipal, C.D. Vista Hermosa (2007, 2008, 2010), UES (2013-2014), C.D. Pasaquina (2014), Atletico Marte (2012-2013, 2015)
  Marcelo Javier Zuleta - Alianza F.C. (2003), A.D. Isidro Metapan (2004)
  Raul Donsati - C.D. Arcense (2003, 2004)
  Rene Ramos - A.D. Isidro Metapan (2003)
  Paulo Roberto de Olivera - Atletico Balboa (2003)
  Jesus Fuentes - Atletico Balboa (2003)
  Juan Mujica - Alianza F.C. (2004)
  Daniel Uberti - San Salvador F.C. (2004), Nejapa F.C. (2008)
  Andres Novara - C.D. Arcense (2004)
  Julio Cesar Cortez - C.D. Aguila (2004)
  Ricardo Ortiz "Tato" - Municipal Limeno (2004)
  Carlos Recinos - Once Lobos (2004)
  Carlos Alberto de Toro - C.D. Aguila (2004), Atletico Balboa (2008, 2009), Firpo (2019)
  Henry Rojas - A.D. Isidro Metapan (2004)
  Miguel Mansilla  +  - Once Municipal (2005-2006), Alianza F.C. (2006)
  Roberto Gamarra - Once Lobos (2005), Atletico Balboa (2008, 2010), C.D. FAS (2008, 2009, 2010, 2016), Alianza F.C. (2011), UES (2012), Firpo (2013, 2020-2022), C.D. Dragon (2014-2015), A.D. Isidro Metapan (2016-2017)
  Leonel Carcamo - Firpo (2005, 2006, 2007), San Salvador F.C. (2006), Alianza F.C. (2012), Once Municipal (2012), Firpo (2014), Santa Tecla (2019)
   Vladan Vićević - C.D. Aguila (2005, 2006), C.D. Chalatenango (2007-2008), Alianza F.C. (2011-2012), C.D. Aguila (2013)
  Oscar del Solar - Alianza F.C. (2005)
  Carlos Alberto Mijangos - C.D. Chalatenango (2005), Atlético Balboa (2010), C.D. Aguila (2010), C.D. Chalatenango (2017-)
  Nelson Mauricio Ancheta - C.D. FAS (2005, 2006, 2007-2008), Atletico Balboa (2006), Once Municipal (2006-2007), Nejapa F.C. (2009), Alianza F.C. (2009), C.D. Aguila (2010), Once Municipal (2010-2011), Firpo (2011-2012), C.D. Dragon (2013-2014), C.D. Chalatenango (2016), C.D. Dragon (2016-2017), Jocoro F.C. (2018), C.D. Sonsonate (2019), Jocoro F.C. (2019), El Vencedor (2020), Limeno (2020-2021), Atletico Marte (2021-2022)
  Carlos de los Cobos - C.D. FAS (2005, 2006)
  Odir Jacques - Alianza F.C. (2006)
  Antonio Orellana Rico - San Salvador F.C. (2006, 2007)
  Julio Asad - C.D. FAS (2006, 2007)
  Gary Stempel - C.D. Aguila (2007)
  Luis Ramirez Zapata  - C.D. Aguila (2007). Atletico Balboa (2009)
  Pablo Centrone - Alianza F.C. (2007, 2008), C.D. Aguila (2008, 2009)
  Horacio Cordero - Firpo (2007)
  Carlos Antonio Meléndez - Nejapa F.C. (2007), C.D. Chalatenango (2008, 2009), Alacranes Del Norte (2010), UES (2013), Atletico Marte (2015) 
  Abel Moralejo - Once Municipal (2007)
  Gerardo Reinoso - Firpo (2008)
  Mauricio Cienfuegos - Nejapa F.C. (2008)
  Juan Ramón Sánchez - C.D. Chalatenango (2008), Juventud Independiente (2008, 2009, 2011-2015), C.D. Aguila (2016), Firpo (2016-2017), C.D. Sonsonate (2018), C.D. Chalatenango (2019-2020)
  Mario Elias Guevara - Once Municipal (2008), C.D. Sonsonate (2016-), Once Deportivo de Ahuachapan (2021)
  Jorge Abrego - Juventud Independiente (2008), C.D. FAS (2010), UES (2011, 2012-2013), Juventud Independiente (2015)
  Víctor Coreas - C.D. Vista Hermosa (2008-2009), Limeno (2009, 2010), Vista Hermosa (2010-2011), Aguila (2012-2013), Pasaquina (2015), Dragon (2017), Limeno (2018), El Vencedor (2019), Isidro Metapan (2019-2020), Jocoro (2021) 
  Emiliano Pedrozo - Nejapa (2008), FAS (2016-2017)
  Carlos Jurado - Alianza (2008, 2009)
  Carlos García Cantarero  - Alianza (2009)
  Armando Contreras - Vista Hermosa (2009)
  Eraldo Correia - Aguila (2009), Aguila (2010), Municipal Limeno (2010), UES (2011), Aguila (2011-2012), Aguila  (2015), Firpo (2017-2018, 2022), Pasaquina (2018-2019)
  Eduardo Santana - Atletico Balboa (2009)
  Ramiro Cepeda - Atletico Marte (2009, 2010), Firpo (2011), Alianza F.C. (2012-2013), Firpo (2013-2014), Alianza F.C. (2015)
  Miguel Angel Soriano - Limeno (2009), Alianza F.C. (2009), UES (2011)
  Adolfo Menendez - C.D. FAS (2010)
  Edgar Henriquez - UES (2010), Firpo (2012-2013), Santa Tecla F.C. (2013-2014), UES (2016), Jocoro F.C. (2022), Chalatenango (2022)
  Alberto Rujana- C.D. FAS (2010)
  Luis Guevara Mora- Atletico Marte (2010)
  Marcos Pineda - Once Municipal (2011)
  Juan Andres Sarulyte - Once Municipal (2011-2012), Alianza F.C. (2013), C.D. Pasaquina (2015), C.D. Chalatenango (2015), Atletico Marte (2016), Jocoro (2020), Santa Tecla F.C. (2020)       
  Salvador Coreas - C.D. Aguila (2011)
  Willian Renderos Iraheta - C.D. FAS (2011), Santa Tecla F.C. (2013), UES (2014-2015), C.D. Sonsonate (2016), C.D. Chalatenango (2017-2018), C.D. Audaz (2018), C.D. Municipal Limeno (2019), Independiente (2020), Firpo
  José Rolando Perez - C.D. Vista Hermosa (2011)
  Carlos Romero - C.D. Vista Hermosa (2011), C.D. Dragon (2017), C.D. Audaz (2018), C.D. Aguila (2018-2019), Jocoro (2020-2021), Once Deportivo de Ahuachapan (2021), Limeno (2022), Firpo
   José Efraín Núñez - C.D. Vista Hermosa (2012)
  Guillermo Rivera - Santa Tecla (2012), Atletico Marte (2013-2014), C.D. Dragon (2015), FAS (2019-2020), Platense (2022), Firpo (2023-)
  Osvaldo Escudero - Santa Tecla (2012, 2014-2016, 2020), C.D. FAS (2016-2017), C.D. Aguila (2017-2018), Atletico Marte (2022-)
  Omar Sevilla - Aguila  (2011), Aguila  (2013), Dragon (2015-2016), Pasaquina (2017), Independiente (2019-2020)
  William Osorio - C.D. FAS (2013)
  Jaime de la Pava - C.D. FAS (2013)
  Jorge Humberto Rodriguez - A.D. Isidro Metapan (2013-2016, 2023-), Alianza F.C. (2017-2019), C.D. FAS (2020-2022)
  Raúl Martínez Sambulá - C.D. Aguila (2013-2014)
  Alejandro Curbelo - Alianza F.C. (2014)
  Efrain Burgos - C.D. FAS (2014), UES (2015), Atletico Marte (2016), UES (2016-2017), C.D. Dragon (2017)
  Jairo Ríos Rendón - C.D. Aguila (2014)
  Daniel Messina - C.D. Aguila (2014), C.D. Aguila (2019)
  Julio Dely Valdés - C.D. Aguila (2015)
  Daniel Fernández - Atletico Marte (2015), Alianza F.C. (2016)
  Santos Rivera - C.D. Dragon (2015), C.D. Aguila (2019)
  Abel Blanco - C.D. Dragon (2015)
  German Pérez - C.D. Sonsonate (2015), C.D. Audaz (2017, 2018)
  Ennio Mendoza and Mario Elias Guevara - C.D. Sonsonate (2015, 2016, 2017)
  Héctor Jara - C.D. Sonsonate (2015)
  Ricardo Serrano  - C.D. Chalatenango  (2015-2016, 2021, 2023-)
  Douglas Vidal Jiménez - Atletico Marte (2015-2016)
  Hugo Ovelar - C.D. Pasaquina (2016), Limeno (2017), C.D. Sonsonate (2018)
  Carlos Eduardo Martínez Sequeira - FAS (2016)
  Milton Meléndez - Alianza (2016, 2020-2022)
  Edgardo Malvestiti- Aguila  (2016)
  Ernesto Corti  - Santa Tecla  (2016-2017, 2022-), Aguila  (2020-2021)
  Mauricio Alfaro - Limeno (2016)
  Geovanni Portillo - Chalatenango  (2016, 2018)
   Horacio Reyes  - UES (2016)
   Francisco Robles - Limeno (2016-2017), Pasaquina (2018)
  Darío Larrosa - Aguila (2016)
  Jorge Daniel Casanova - Aguila (2017)
  Ernesto Góchez - Sonsonate (2017)
  Álvaro Misael Alfaro - Isidro Metapan (2017), Audaz (2018), Chalatenango (2018-2019), Limeno (2020), Isidro Metapan (2021)
  Cristian Edgardo Álvarez - FAS (2017-2018)
  Manuel Carranza Murillo - Pasaquina (2017-2018)
  Diego Pizarro - Dragon (2018)
  Emiliano Barrera - Limeno (2018)
  Rubén da Silva - Santa Tecla (2018), Sonsonate (2019-2020), Santa Tecla (2021), Once Deportivo (2022), Platense (2023-)
  Marvin Benitez - Aguila (2018), Jocoro (2019), Dragon (2022-)
  Giovanni Trigueros - Firpo (2018), Limeno (2021)
  Álvaro de Jesús Gómez - FAS  (2018)
  Erick Dowson Prado - FAS  (2018-2019), Chalatenango (2021-2022), Platense (2022), Once Deportivo (2023-)
  Christian Díaz  - Santa Tecla (2018-2019)
  Ángel Piazzi - Chalatenango (2018)
  Jorge Calles - Firpo (2018)
  Asdrúbal Kaselly Flores - Firpo (2018-2019)
  Cristobal Cubilla - Jocoro  (2019)
  Pablo Quiñones - Audaz (2019), Once Deportivo (2019), Jocoro (2021) 
  Jose Manuel Romero - Pasaquina (2019), Jocoro (2020), Municipal Limeno (2021)
  Omar Pimentel - Sonsonate (2019)
  Rodolfo Gochez - Santa Tecla (2019, 2021), Once Deportivo de Ahuachapan (2022)
  Sebastian Abreu - Santa Tecla (2019)
  Wilson Gutierrez - Alianza (2019-2020)
  Juan Cortes Diéguez - Independiente (2019), Once Deportivo (2020), Alianza (2020), Isidro Metapan (2021)
  Oscar Eduardo Alvarez - Jocoro F.C. (2019)
  Marco Sanchez - Santa Tecla (2019)
  Jaime Medina - Santa Tecla (2020-2021)
  Cristian Domizzi - Atletico Marte (2020-2021), Aguila (2021)
  Osvaldo Figueroa - Isidro Metapan (2020)
  Ricardo Montoya - Chalatenango (2020-2021)
  Fabio Castroman - Sonsonate (2021)
  Armando Osma Rueda - Aguila (2021)
  Bruno Martinez - Once Deportivo  (2020-2021), Municipal Limeno (2021)
  Hector Omar Mejía - Isidro Metapan (2022-)
  Ivan Ruiz - Platense (2022)
  Octavio Zambrano - FAS
  Jorge Pineda - Jocoro (2022)
  Sebastian Bini - Aguila (2022-)
  Adonay Martinez - Alianza (2022)
  Guillermo Bernandez - Jocoro (2023-)
  Eduardo Lara - Alianza (2023-)

List of El Salvador Football Primera División Championship winning coaches

Primera Division